Cathal Moore (born 26 July 1975) is an Irish sportsperson. He played hurling with his local club Turloughmore and was a member of the Galway senior inter-county team from the 1990s until the 2000s where he played centre-forward and centre-back.  Moore currently works as a hurling analyst with TG4 and is principal  in Presentation College, Athenry.

References

1975 births
Living people
Connacht inter-provincial hurlers
Gaelic games writers and broadcasters
Galway inter-county hurlers
Heads of schools in Ireland
Turloughmore hurlers